Stefano Magnasco Galindo (born 28 September 1992) is a Chilean footballer who plays for Unión Española as a right back.

Career
Product of Universidad Católica youth ranks, he debuted in May 2011, thanks to Juan Antonio Pizzi, coach of Católica in that moment. In September of that year, Magnasco was on trial at Premier League club Bolton Wanderers, failing to sign here and then not joining Chelsea, that also attempted to sign him. However, in mid–2012, he joined Groningen, of this form leaving his country with a Copa Chile honour.

Honours

Club
Universidad Católica
 Primera División de Chile (5): 2016–A, 2016–C,2018, 2019, 2020
 Copa Chile (1): 2011
 Supercopa de Chile (2): 2016, 2019

References

External links
 Magnasco at Football Lineups
 
 Voetbal International profile 	

1992 births
Living people
Chilean people of Italian descent
Footballers from Santiago
Chilean footballers
Chilean expatriate footballers
Club Deportivo Universidad Católica footballers
FC Groningen players
Deportes La Serena footballers
Unión Española footballers
Chilean Primera División players
Eredivisie players
Chilean expatriate sportspeople in the Netherlands
Expatriate footballers in the Netherlands
Association football fullbacks